

Events

Pre-1600
 325 – The original Nicene Creed is adopted at the First Council of Nicaea.
1179 – The Battle of Kalvskinnet takes place outside Nidaros (now Trondheim), Norway. Earl Erling Skakke is killed, and the battle changes the tide of the civil wars.
1306 – The Earl of Pembroke's army defeats Bruce's Scottish army at the Battle of Methven.
1586 – English colonists leave Roanoke Island, after failing to establish England's first permanent settlement in North America.

1601–1900
1718 – At least 73,000 people died in the 1718 Tongwei–Gansu earthquake due to landslides in the Qing dynasty.
1770 – New Church Day: Emanuel Swedenborg wrote: "The Lord sent forth His twelve disciples, who followed Him in the world into the whole spiritual world to preach the Gospel that the Lord God Jesus Christ reigns. This took place on the 19th day of June, in the year 1770."
1785 – The Boston King's Chapel adopts James Freeman's revised prayer book, sans Nicene Creed, establishing it as the first Unitarian congregation in the United States.
1800 – War of the Second Coalition Battle of Höchstädt results in a French victory over Austria. 
1816 – Battle of Seven Oaks between North West Company and Hudson's Bay Company, near Winnipeg, Manitoba, Canada.
1821 – Decisive defeat of the Filiki Eteria by the Ottomans at Drăgășani (in Wallachia).
1846 – The first officially recorded, organized baseball game is played under Alexander Cartwright's rules on Hoboken, New Jersey's Elysian Fields with the New York Base Ball Club defeating the Knickerbockers 23–1. Cartwright umpired.
1850 – Princess Louise of the Netherlands marries Crown Prince Karl of Sweden–Norway.
1862 – The U.S. Congress prohibits slavery in United States territories, nullifying Dred Scott v. Sandford.
1865 – Over two years after the Emancipation Proclamation, slaves in Galveston, Texas, United States, are officially informed of their freedom. The anniversary was officially celebrated in Texas and other states as Juneteenth. On June 17, 2021, Juneteenth officially became a federal holiday in the United States.
1867 – Maximilian I of the Second Mexican Empire is executed by a firing squad in Querétaro, Querétaro.
1875 – The Herzegovinian rebellion against the Ottoman Empire begins.

1901–present
1903 – Benito Mussolini, at the time a radical Socialist, is arrested by Bern police for advocating a violent general strike.
1910 – The first Father's Day is celebrated in Spokane, Washington.
1913 – Natives Land Act, 1913 in South Africa implemented.
1921 – The village of Knockcroghery, Ireland, was burned by British forces.
1934 – The Communications Act of 1934 establishes the United States' Federal Communications Commission (FCC).
1943 – The Philadelphia Eagles and Pittsburgh Steelers of the NFL merge for one season due to player shortages caused by World War II.
1947 – Pan Am Flight 121 crashes in the Syrian Desert near Mayadin, Syria, killing 15 and injuring 21.
1953 – Cold War: Julius and Ethel Rosenberg are executed at Sing Sing, in New York.
1960 – The first NASCAR race was held at Charlotte Motor Speedway.
1961 – Kuwait declares independence from the United Kingdom.
1964 – The Civil Rights Act of 1964 is approved after surviving an 83-day filibuster in the United States Senate.
1965 – Nguyễn Cao Kỳ becomes Prime Minister of South Vietnam at the head of a military junta; General Nguyễn Văn Thiệu becomes the figurehead chief of state.
1978 – Garfield's first comic strip, originally published locally as Jon in 1976, goes into nationwide syndication.
1985 – Members of the Revolutionary Party of Central American Workers, dressed as Salvadoran soldiers, attack the Zona Rosa area of San Salvador.
1987 – Basque separatist group ETA commits one of its most violent attacks, in which a bomb is set off in a supermarket, Hipercor, killing 21 and injuring 45.
1988 – Pope John Paul II canonizes 117 Vietnamese Martyrs.
1990 – The current international law defending indigenous peoples, Indigenous and Tribal Peoples Convention, 1989, is ratified for the first time by Norway.
  1990   – The Communist Party of the Russian Soviet Federative Socialist Republic is founded in Moscow.
1991 – The last Soviet army units in Hungary are withdrawn.
2005 – Following a series of Michelin tire failures during the United States Grand Prix weekend at Indianapolis, and without an agreement being reached, 14 cars from seven teams in Michelin tires withdrew after completing the formation lap, leaving only six cars from three teams on Bridgestone tires to race.
2007 – The al-Khilani Mosque bombing in Baghdad leaves 78 people dead and another 218 injured.
2009 – Mass riots involving over 10,000 people and 10,000 police officers break out in Shishou, China, over the dubious circumstances surrounding the death of a local chef.
  2009   – War in North-West Pakistan: The Pakistani Armed Forces open Operation Rah-e-Nijat against the Taliban and other Islamist rebels in the South Waziristan area of the Federally Administered Tribal Areas.
2012 – WikiLeaks founder Julian Assange requested asylum in London's Ecuadorian Embassy for fear of extradition to the US after publication of previously classified documents including footage of civilian killings by the US army.
2018 – The 10,000,000th United States Patent is issued.
2018 – Antwon Rose II was fatally shot in East Pittsburgh by East Pittsburgh Police Officer Michael Rosfeld after being involved in a near-fatal drive-by shooting.

Births

Pre-1600
1301 – Prince Morikuni, shōgun of Japan (d. 1333)
1417 – Sigismondo Pandolfo Malatesta, lord of Rimini (d. 1468)
1566 – James VI and I of the United Kingdom (d. 1625)
1590 – Philip Bell, British colonial governor (d. 1678)
1595 – Hargobind, sixth Sikh guru (d. 1644)
1598 – Gilbert Sheldon, Archbishop of Canterbury (d. 1677)

1601–1900
1606 – James Hamilton, 1st Duke of Hamilton, Scottish soldier and politician, Lord Chancellor of Scotland (d. 1649)
1623 – Blaise Pascal, French mathematician and physicist (d. 1662)
1633 – Philipp van Limborch, Dutch author and theologian (d. 1712)
1701 – François Rebel, French violinist and composer (d. 1775)
1731 – Joaquim Machado de Castro, Portuguese sculptor (d. 1822)
1764 – José Gervasio Artigas, Uruguayan general and politician (d. 1850)
1771 – Joseph Diaz Gergonne, French mathematician and philosopher (d. 1859)
1776 – Francis Johnson, American lawyer and politician (d. 1842)
1783 – Friedrich Sertürner, German chemist and pharmacist (d. 1841)
1793 – Joseph Earl Sheffield, American businessman and philanthropist (d. 1882)
1795 – James Braid, Scottish-English surgeon (d. 1860)
1797 – Hamilton Hume, Australian explorer  (d. 1873)
1815 – Cornelius Krieghoff, Dutch-Canadian painter (d. 1872)
1816 – William H. Webb, American shipbuilder and philanthropist, founded the Webb Institute (d. 1899)
1833 – Mary Tenney Gray, American editorial writer, club-woman, philanthropist, and suffragette (d. 1904)
1834 – Charles Spurgeon, English pastor and author (d. 1892)
1840 – Georg Karl Maria Seidlitz, German entomologist and academic (d. 1917)
1843 – Mary Sibbet Copley, American philanthropist (d. 1929) 
1845 – Cléophas Beausoleil, Canadian journalist and politician (d. 1904)
1846 – Antonio Abetti, Italian astronomer and academic (d. 1928)
1850 – David Jayne Hill, American historian and politician, 24th United States Assistant Secretary of State (d. 1932)
1851 – Billy Midwinter, English-Australian cricketer (d. 1890)
  1851   – Silvanus P. Thompson, English physicist, engineer, and academic (d. 1916)
1854 – Alfredo Catalani, Italian composer and academic (d. 1893)
  1854   – Hjalmar Mellin, Finnish mathematician and theorist (d. 1933)
1855 – George F. Roesch, American lawyer and politician (d. 1917)
1858 – Sam Walter Foss, American poet and librarian (d. 1911)
1861 – Douglas Haig, 1st Earl Haig, Scottish-English field marshal (d. 1928)
  1861   – Émile Haug, French geologist and paleontologist (d. 1927)
  1861   – José Rizal, Filipino journalist, author, and poet (d. 1896)
1865 – May Whitty, English actress (d. 1948)
1871 – Alajos Szokolyi, Hungarian hurdler, jumper, and physician (d. 1932)
1872 – Theodore Payne, English-American gardener and botanist (d. 1963)
1874 – Peder Oluf Pedersen, Danish physicist and engineer (d. 1941)
1876 – Nigel Gresley, Scottish-English engineer (d. 1941)
1877 – Charles Coburn, American actor (d. 1961)
1881 – Maginel Wright Enright, American illustrator (d. 1966) 
1883 – Gladys Mills Phipps, American horse breeder (d. 1970)
1884 – Georges Ribemont-Dessaignes, French painter and historian (d. 1974)
1886 – Finley Hamilton, American lawyer and politician (d. 1940)
1888 – Arthur Massey Berry, Canadian soldier and pilot (d. 1970)
1891 – John Heartfield, German photographer and activist (d. 1968)
1896 – Rajani Palme Dutt, English journalist and politician (d. 1974)
  1896   – Wallis Simpson, American wife of Edward VIII (d. 1986)
1897 – Cyril Norman Hinshelwood, English chemist and academic, Nobel Prize laureate (d. 1967)
  1897   – Moe Howard, American comedian (d. 1975)

1901–present
1902 – Guy Lombardo, Canadian-American violinist and bandleader (d. 1977)
1903 – Mary Callery, American-French sculptor and academic (d. 1977)
  1903   – Lou Gehrig, American baseball player (d. 1941)
  1903   – Wally Hammond, English cricketer and coach (d. 1965)
  1903   – Hans Litten, German lawyer (d. 1938)
1905 – Mildred Natwick, American actress (d. 1994)
1906 – Ernst Boris Chain, German-Irish biochemist and academic, Nobel Prize laureate (d. 1979)
  1906   – Knut Kroon, Swedish footballer (d. 1975)
  1906   – Walter Rauff, German SS officer (d. 1984)
1907 – Clarence Wiseman, Canadian 10th General of the Salvation Army (d. 1985)
1909 – Osamu Dazai, Japanese author (d. 1948)
  1909   – Rūdolfs Jurciņš, Latvian basketball player (d. 1948)
1910 – Sydney Allard, English race car driver, founded the Allard Company (d. 1966)
  1910   – Paul Flory, American chemist and engineer, Nobel Prize laureate (d. 1985)
  1910   – Abe Fortas, American lawyer and jurist (d. 1982)
1912 – Don Gutteridge, American baseball player and manager (d. 2008)
  1912   – Virginia MacWatters, American soprano and actress (d. 2005)
1913 – Helene Madison, American swimmer (d. 1970)
1914 – Alan Cranston, American journalist and politician (d. 2000)
  1914   – Lester Flatt, American bluegrass singer-songwriter, guitarist, and mandolin player (d. 1979)
1915 – Pat Buttram, American actor (d. 1994)
  1915   – Julius Schwartz, American publisher and agent (d. 2004)
1917 – Joshua Nkomo, Zimbabwean guerrilla leader and politician, Vice President of Zimbabwe (d. 1999)
1919 – Pauline Kael, American film critic (d. 2001)
1920 – Yves Robert, French actor, director, and screenwriter (d. 2002)
1921 – Louis Jourdan, French-American actor and singer (d. 2015)
1922 – Aage Bohr, Danish physicist and academic, Nobel Prize laureate (d. 2009)
  1922   – Marilyn P. Johnson, American educator and diplomat, 8th United States Ambassador to Togo
1923 – Bob Hank, Australian footballer and coach (d. 2012)
1926 – Erna Schneider Hoover, American mathematician and inventor
1927 – Luciano Benjamín Menéndez, Argentine general and human rights violator (d. 2018)
1928 – Tommy DeVito, American singer and guitarist (d. 2020)
  1928   – Nancy Marchand, American actress (d. 2000)
1930 – Gena Rowlands, American actress
1932 – Pier Angeli, Italian actress (d. 1971)
  1932   – José Sanchis Grau, Spanish author and illustrator (d. 2011)
  1932   – Marisa Pavan, Italian actress 
1933 – Viktor Patsayev, Kazakh engineer and astronaut (d. 1971)
1934 – Gérard Latortue, Haitian politician, 12th Prime Minister of Haiti (d. 2023)
1936 – Marisa Galvany, American soprano and actress
1937 – André Glucksmann, French philosopher and author (d. 2015)
1938 – Wahoo McDaniel, American football player and wrestler (d. 2002)
1939 – Bernd Hoss, German footballer and manager (d. 2016)
  1939   – John F. MacArthur, American minister and theologian
1941 – Václav Klaus, Czech economist and politician, 2nd President of the Czech Republic
1942 – Merata Mita, New Zealand director and producer (d. 2010)
1944 – Chico Buarque, Brazilian singer, composer, writer and poet
1945 – Radovan Karadžić, Serbian-Bosnian politician and convicted war criminal, 1st President of Republika Srpska
  1945   – Aung San Suu Kyi, Burmese politician, Nobel Prize laureate
  1945   – Tobias Wolff, American short story writer, memoirist, and novelist
  1945   – Peter Bardens, British keyboardist
1946 – Jimmy Greenhoff, English footballer and manager
1947 – Salman Rushdie, Indian-English novelist and essayist 
  1947   – John Ralston Saul, Canadian philosopher and author
1948 – Nick Drake, English singer-songwriter (d. 1974)
  1948   – Phylicia Rashad, American actress 
1950 – Neil Asher Silberman, American archaeologist and historian
  1950   – Ann Wilson, American singer-songwriter and musician 
1951 – Ayman al-Zawahiri, Egyptian terrorist (d. 2022)
  1951   – Francesco Moser, Italian cyclist
1952 – Bob Ainsworth, English politician, Secretary of State for Defence
1954 – Mike O'Brien, English lawyer and politician, Solicitor General for England and Wales
  1954   – Lou Pearlman, American music producer and fraudster (d. 2016)
  1954   – Kathleen Turner, American actress
  1954   – Richard Wilkins, New Zealand-Australian journalist and television presenter
1955 – Mary O'Connor, New Zealand runner
  1955   – Mary Schapiro, American lawyer and politician
1957 – Anna Lindh, Swedish politician, 39th Swedish Minister of Foreign Affairs (d. 2003)
  1957   – Jean Rabe, American journalist and author
1958 – Sergei Makarov, Russian-American ice hockey player and coach
1959 – Mark DeBarge, American singer-songwriter and trumpet player
  1959   – Christian Wulff, German lawyer and politician, 10th President of Germany
1960 – Andrew Dilnot, English economist and academic
  1960   – Johnny Gray, American runner and coach
  1960   – Luke Morley, English guitarist, songwriter, and producer 
  1960   – Patti Rizzo, American golfer
1962 – Paula Abdul, American singer-songwriter, dancer, actress, and presenter
  1962   – Jeremy Bates, English tennis player
  1962   – Ashish Vidyarthi, Indian actor
1963 – Laura Ingraham, American radio host and author
  1963   – Margarita Ponomaryova, Russian hurdler
  1963   – Rory Underwood, English rugby player, lieutenant, and pilot
1964 – Brent Goulet, American soccer player and manager
  1964   – Boris Johnson, Prime Minister of the United Kingdom and former Mayor of London
  1964   – Brian Vander Ark, American singer-songwriter and guitarist
1965 – Sabine Braun, German heptathlete
  1965   – Sadie Frost, English actress and producer
1966 – Michalis Romanidis, Greek basketball player
1967 – Bjørn Dæhlie, Norwegian skier and businessman
1968 – Alastair Lynch, Australian footballer and sportscaster
  1968   – Timothy Morton, American philosopher and academic
1968 – Kimberly Anne "Kim" Walker, American film and television actress (d. 2001)
1970 – Rahul Gandhi, Indian politician
  1970   – Quincy Watts, American sprinter and football player
  1970   – Brian Welch, American singer-songwriter and guitarist
1971 – José Emilio Amavisca, Spanish footballer 
  1971   – Chris Armstrong, English footballer
1972 – Jean Dujardin, French actor
  1972   – Ilya Markov, Russian race walker
  1972   – Brian McBride, American soccer player and coach
  1972   – Robin Tunney, American actress 
1973 – Jahine Arnold, American football player
  1973   – Yuko Nakazawa, Japanese singer 
  1973   – Yasuhiko Yabuta, Japanese baseball player
1974 – Doug Mientkiewicz, American baseball player, coach, and manager 
1974 – Mustaque Ahmed Ruhi, Bangladeshi member of parliament 
1975 – Hugh Dancy, English actor and model
  1975   – Anthony Parker, American basketball player
1976 – Anar Baghirov, Azerbaijani lawyer
  1976   – Dennis Crowley, American businessman, co-founded Foursquare
  1976   – Bryan Hughes, English footballer and manager
  1976   – Anita Wilson, American singer-songwriter and producer
1978 – Dirk Nowitzki, German basketball player
  1978   – Zoe Saldana, American actress
  1978   – Claudio Vargas, Dominican baseball player
1979 – José Kléberson, Brazilian footballer
1980 – Jean Carroll, Irish cricketer
  1980   – Dan Ellis, Canadian ice hockey player
  1980   – Robbie Neilson, Scottish footballer and manager
  1980   – Nuno Santos, Portuguese footballer
1981 – Mohammed Al-Khuwalidi, Saudi Arabian long jumper
  1981   – Moss Burmester, New Zealand swimmer
1982 – Alexander Frolov, Russian ice hockey player
  1982   – Chris Vermeulen, Australian motorcycle racer
  1982   – Michael Yarmush, American actor
1983 – Macklemore, American rapper 
  1983   – Aidan Turner, Irish actor
1984 – Paul Dano, American actor 
  1984   – Wieke Dijkstra, Dutch field hockey player
  1984   – Andri Eleftheriou, Cypriot sport shooter
1985 – Ai Miyazato, Japanese golfer
  1985   – José Ernesto Sosa, Argentinian footballer
  1985   – Dire Tune, Ethiopian runner
1986 – Aoiyama Kōsuke, Bulgarian sumo wrestler
  1986   – Lázaro Borges, Cuban pole vaulter
  1986   – Marvin Williams, American basketball player
1987 – Rashard Mendenhall, American football player
1988 – Jacob deGrom, American baseball player
1990 – Moa Hjelmer, Swedish sprinter
  1990   – Xavier Rhodes, American football player
1992 – Keaton Jennings, South African-English cricketer 
  1992   – C. J. Mosley, American football player
1993 – Olajide Olatunji, English YouTuber
2004 – Millie Gibson, English actress

Deaths

Pre-1600
 404 – Huan Xuan, Jin-dynasty warlord and emperor of Huan Chu (b. 369)
 626 – Soga no Umako, Japanese son of Soga no Iname (b. 551)
 930 – Xiao Qing, chancellor of Later Liang (b. 862)
1027 – Romuald, Italian mystic and saint (b. 951)
1185 – Taira no Munemori, Japanese soldier (b. 1147)
1282 – Eleanor de Montfort, Welsh princess (b. 1252)
1312 – Piers Gaveston, 1st Earl of Cornwall, English politician (b. 1284)
1341 – Juliana Falconieri, Italian nun and saint (b. 1270) 
1364 – Elisenda of Montcada, queen consort and regent of Aragon  (b. 1292)
1504 – Bernhard Walther, German astronomer and humanist (b. 1430)
1542 – Leo Jud, Swiss theologian and reformer (b. 1482)
1545 – Abraomas Kulvietis, Lithuanian-Russian lawyer and jurist (b. 1509)
1567 – Anna of Brandenburg, Duchess of Mecklenburg (b. 1507)

1601–1900
1608 – Alberico Gentili, Italian lawyer and jurist (b. 1551)
1650 – Matthäus Merian, Swiss-German engraver and publisher (b. 1593)
1747 – Alessandro Marcello, Italian composer and educator (b. 1669)
  1747   – Nader Shah, Persian leader (b. 1688)
1762 – Johann Ernst Eberlin, German organist and composer (b. 1702)
1768 – Benjamin Tasker Sr., American soldier and politician, 10th Colonial Governor of Maryland (b. 1690)
1786 – Nathanael Greene, American general (b. 1742)
1805 – Louis-Jean-François Lagrenée, French painter and educator (b. 1724)
1820 – Joseph Banks, English botanist and author (b. 1743)
1844 – Étienne Geoffroy Saint-Hilaire, French zoologist and biologist (b. 1772)
1864 – Richard Heales, English-Australian politician, 4th Premier of Victoria (b. 1822)
  1864   – Sarah Rosetta Wakeman, American soldier (b. 1843)
1865 – Evangelos Zappas, Greek-Romanian businessman and philanthropist (b. 1800)
1867 – Miguel Miramón, Unconstitutional president of Mexico, 1859-1860 (b. 1832)
  1867   – Maximilian I of Mexico (b. 1832)
1874 – Ferdinand Stoliczka, Moravian palaeontologist and ornithologist (b. 1838)
1884 – Juan Bautista Alberdi, Argentinian-French politician and diplomat (b. 1810)

1901–present
1903 – Herbert Vaughan, English cardinal (b. 1832)
1918 – Francesco Baracca, Italian fighter pilot (b. 1888)
1921 – Ramón López Velarde, Mexican poet and author (b. 1888)
1922 – Hitachiyama Taniemon, Japanese sumo wrestler, the 19th Yokozuna (b. 1874)
1932 – Sol Plaatje, South African journalist and activist (b. 1876)
1937 – J. M. Barrie, Scottish novelist and playwright (b. 1860)
1939 – Grace Abbott, American social worker and activist (b. 1878)
1940 – Maurice Jaubert, French composer and conductor (b. 1900)
1941 – C. V. Hartman, Swiss botanist and anthropologist (b. 1862)
  1941   – Otto Hirsch, German jurist and politician (b. 1885)
1949 – Syed Zafarul Hasan, Indian philosopher and academic (b. 1885)
1951 – Angelos Sikelianos, Greek poet and playwright (b. 1884)
1953 – Ethel Rosenberg, American spy (b. 1915)
  1953   – Julius Rosenberg, American spy (b. 1918)
1956 – Thomas J. Watson, American businessman (b. 1874)
1962 – Frank Borzage, American film director and actor (b. 1894)
1966 – Ed Wynn, American actor and comedian (b. 1886)
1968 – James Joseph Sweeney, American bishop (b. 1898)
1975 – Sam Giancana, American mob boss (b. 1908)
1977 – Ali Shariati, Iranian sociologist and philosopher (b. 1933)
1979 – Paul Popenoe, American explorer and scholar, founded Relationship counseling (b. 1888)
1981 – Anya Phillips, Chinese-American band manager (b. 1955)
  1981   – Subhash Mukherjee, Indian scientist and physician who created India's first, and the world's second, child using in-vitro fertilisation (b. 1931)
1984 – Lee Krasner, American painter and educator (b. 1908)
1986 – Len Bias, American basketball player (b. 1963)
1987 – Margaret Carver Leighton, American author (b. 1896)
1988 – Fernand Seguin, Canadian biochemist and academic (b. 1922)
  1988   – Gladys Spellman, American lawyer and politician (b. 1918)
1989 – Betti Alver, Estonian author and poet (b. 1906)
1990 – George Addes, American trade union leader, co-founded United Automobile Workers (b. 1911)
  1990   – Isobel Andrews, New Zealand writer (b. 1905)
1991 – Jean Arthur, American actress (b. 1900)
1993 – William Golding, British novelist, playwright, and poet, Nobel Prize laureate (b. 1911)
1995 – Peter Townsend, Burmese-English captain and pilot (b. 1914)
2001 – Stanley Mosk, American lawyer, jurist, and politician (b. 1912)
  2001   – John Heyer, Australian director and producer (b. 1916)
2004 – Clayton Kirkpatrick, journalist and newspaper editor (b. 1915)
2007 – Antonio Aguilar, Mexican singer-songwriter, actor, producer, and screenwriter (b. 1919)
  2007   – Alberto Mijangos, Mexican-American painter and educator (b. 1925)
  2007   – Terry Hoeppner, American football player and coach (b. 1947)
  2007   – Ze'ev Schiff, Israeli journalist and author (b. 1932)
2008 – Barun Sengupta, Bengali journalist, founded Bartaman (b. 1934)
2009 – Tomoji Tanabe, Japanese engineer and surveyor (b. 1895)
2010 – Manute Bol, Sudanese-American basketball player and activist (b. 1962)
  2010   – Anthony Quinton, Baron Quinton, English philosopher and academic (b. 1925)
  2010   – Carlos Monsiváis, Mexican writer, journalist and political activist (b. 1938)
2012 – Norbert Tiemann, American soldier and politician, 32nd Governor of Nebraska (b. 1924)
2013 – Vince Flynn, American author (b. 1966)
  2013   – James Gandolfini, American actor and producer (b. 1961)
  2013   – Gyula Horn, Hungarian politician, 37th Prime Minister of Hungary (b. 1932)
  2013   – Dave Jennings, American football player and sportscaster (b. 1952)
  2013   – Filip Topol, Czech singer-songwriter and pianist  (b. 1965)
  2013   – Slim Whitman, American singer-songwriter and guitarist (b. 1923)
2014 – Oskar-Hubert Dennhardt, German general (b. 1915)
  2014   – Gerry Goffin, American songwriter (b. 1939)
  2014   – Ibrahim Touré, Ivorian footballer (b. 1985)
2015 – James Salter, American novelist and short-story writer (b. 1925)
2016 – Anton Yelchin, American actor (b. 1989)
2017 – Otto Warmbier, American college student detained in North Korea (b. 1994) 
2018 – Koko, western lowland gorilla and user of American Sign Language (b. 1971)
2019 – Etika, American YouTuber and streamer (b. 1990)

Holidays and observances 
Christian feast day:
Deodatus (or Didier) of Nevers (or of Jointures)
Gervasius and Protasius (Catholic Church)
Hildegrim of Châlons
Juliana Falconieri
Romuald
Ursicinus of Ravenna
Zosimus
June 19 (Eastern Orthodox liturgics)
New Church feast day
New Church Day
Day of the Independent Hungary (Hungary)
Feast of Forest (Palawan)
Juneteenth (United States)
Labour Day (Trinidad and Tobago)
Laguna Day (Laguna)
Birthday of Jose Gervasio Artigas (Uruguay)
World Sickle Cell Day (International)

References

External links

 
 
 

Days of the year
June